The 2022–23 season is Lech Poznań's 101st season in existence and the club's 21st consecutive season in the top flight of Polish football. In addition to the domestic league, Lech Poznań participated in this season's edition of the Polish Cup, the Polish Super Cup, and the UEFA Champions League. The season covers the period from 1 July 2022 to 30 June 2023.

Players

First-team squad

Out on loan

Pre-season and friendlies

Competitions

Overview

Ekstraklasa

League table

Results summary

Results by round

Matches
The league fixtures were announced on 1 June 2022.

Polish Cup

Polish Super Cup

UEFA Champions League

First qualifying round

|}

UEFA Europa Conference League

Second qualifying round

|}

Third qualifying round

|}

Play-off round

|}

Group stage

Knockout round play-offs

|}

Round of 16

|}

Quarter-finals

|}

Statistics

Goalscorers

References

Lech Poznań seasons
Lech Poznań